Merlin's Cave is a cave located beneath Tintagel Castle,  south-west of Boscastle, Cornwall, England. It is a sea cave formed by marine erosion along a thrust plane between slate and volcanic rocks. The cave fills with water at high tide, but has a sandy floor and is explorable at low tide.

Tennyson made Merlin's Cave famous in his Idylls of the King, describing waves bringing the infant Arthur to the shore and Merlin carrying him to safety.

References

External links

Caves of Cornwall
Merlin
Tintagel